Admiral Island is located in the Buccaneer Archipelago off the Kimberley Coast of Western Australia.

References

Buccaneer Archipelago